Siela is a Lithuanian gothic rock band founded in 1990 and still active today. The band's name comes from Lithuanian word siela which means soul. 

Siela was a pioneer of gothic rock in Lithuania. In 1996 their song Vėjas. Žvaigždė ("Wind. Star") became No. 1 at "Radiocentras" Lithuanian music top. In the 1990s they also made such popular songs as Rudenio Dievas ("God of Autumn"), Tavęs man reikėjo ("I needed you"), Meilę skriaudžia dangus ("Sky harms the love"). 

In 2008 Siela released album Euforija which was positively evaluated by critics and contained songs designated for a wider audience. In 2009 Siela was nominated for the best rock band's award at Radiocentras Music Awards. 

At their long history Siela played not only at various Lithuanian music festivals but also at Wave-Gotik-Treffen in Germany in 1996 and 2004, and Castle Party in Poland in 2001. In 2010 Siela organized their 20-year jubilee concert with other Lithuanian musicians like Andrius Mamontovas, Alina Orlova, Lemon Joy, Thundertale, Mano juodoji sesuo. In 2011 Siela performed an acoustic concert at Vilnius St. Catherine's church and released a new album Visa matanti akis ("All seeing eye").

Members 
 Aurelijus Sirgedas – vocals
 Darius Juodka – drums
 Kostas Kriaučiūnas – guitar
 Bernardas Prušinskas – bass guitar
 Aurimas Driukas – lead guitar

Discography 
 Vėjas nešantis naktį, 1990
 Prakeikimas, 1991
 Juodo opiumo žemė, 1993
 Už regėjimo lauko, 1994
 Sielininkai, 1995 
 Tremtyje, 1997
 Tavęs man reikėjo, 1997 
 Eldorado, 2000 (virtual CD)
 Dali, 2005
 Euforija, 2008
 XX, 2010 (compilation, various artists)
 Visa matanti akis, 2011 (live sound, Vinyl)
 “Vėtroje”, 2019 CD

References

External links 
Myspace page
Label's page

Lithuanian rock music groups
Lithuanian gothic rock groups
Musical groups established in 1990
1990 establishments in Lithuania